Aleksey Samuilovich Greig (6 September 1775 – 18 January 1845), born into the noble Greig family, was an admiral of the Imperial Russian Navy. Born in Kronstadt, he was the son of Admiral Samuel Greig (1735–1788, then Governor of Kronstadt), brother-in-law of Mary Somerville, and father of General Samuil Greig (1827–1887), Russian Minister of Finance.

He studied at the Royal High School, Edinburgh under the Rector Alexander Adam from 1783 to 1785, and then served as a volunteer on board , under Captain Thomas Troubridge.

Greig started his career in the British Royal Navy, serving in East India and Europe from 1785 to 1796. He returned to Russia to take part in the Mediterranean expeditions against France from 1798–1800. Under the command of Admiral Dmitry Senyavin, he distinguished himself in 1807 in the Battle of Athos and the Battle of the Dardanelles, which resulted in the Russian occupation of Lemnos and Tenedos. At the close of the Napoleonic Wars he was placed in command of the sea blockade of Danzig during the 1813 siege of Danzig.

Greig was not the only Russian officer of Scottish descent. While still a captain, he and another Scotsman, Captain Brown, were involved in some trouble due to the wreck of the Imperial frigate Archangel in 1797. In the following year, in the squadron off the Texel, he commanded the 64-gun Retvizan; and Captain Robert Crown, said to be a Scot, had the 74-gun Utislaw.

In 1801 Greig was banished to Siberia for a time, in consequence of boldly remonstrating with the Emperor Paul for his severity to some British naval prisoners.

In 1816 Greig became Commander of the Black Sea Fleet, a post which he kept for 17 years. At the same time, he served as Military Governor of Sevastopol and Nikolayev, introducing many reforms and improvements that the grateful citizens of Nikolayev would later erect a statue to his memory in 1873.

During the Russo-Turkish War of 1828–29, Greig's bold leadership made itself felt at the Sieges of Varna and Anapa. He was in full command of the Russian fleet, which he had brought from Sevastopol: forty vessels, eight being of the line, acting in conjunction with the troops under Prince Menshikov for three months by sea and land. During these operations the Emperor Nicholas I of Russia was his guest on board the Parizh,
which had the Diplomatic Chancery and 1,300 persons under her flag.

In 1833 Greig was recalled to Saint Petersburg, where the Emperor Nicholas appointed him a member of the State Council of Imperial Russia and asked him to superintend the construction of the Pulkovo Observatory.

An atoll in French Polynesia Niau is named Greig after Aleksey Greig. It was named in his honor by the Russian Admiral Fabian Gottlieb von Bellingshausen in 1820.

Family
Aleksey Greig married Julia Stalinskaya, who was Jewish. This created social problems for them, when the family moved to St.Petersburg.
They had five children, and their sons all served in the navy, achieving prominence.
Greig's grandfather Charles was an emigrant from Scotland. His father Samuil was an admiral in the Russian Imperial Navy.

Notes

References 

1775 births
1845 deaths
People from Kronstadt
People from Petergofsky Uyezd
Russian people of Scottish descent
Members of the State Council (Russian Empire)
War Governors of Nikolayev and Sevastopol
Imperial Russian Navy admirals
People educated at the Royal High School, Edinburgh
Russian commanders of the Napoleonic Wars
Recipients of the Order of St. George of the Second Degree
British emigrants to Russia